Xylolestes is a genus of beetles in the family Laemophloeidae, containing the following species:

 Xylolestes krombeini Slipinski
 Xylolestes laevior Reitter
 Xylolestes lepidus Grouvelle
 Xylolestes ovalis Grouvelle
 Xylolestes unicolor Grouvelle

References

Laemophloeidae
Cucujoidea genera